Nivaldo Díaz (born 24 March 1994) is a Cuban beach volleyball player.

He competed at the 2016 Summer Olympics in Rio de Janeiro, in the men's beach volleyball tournament.

References

External links

1994 births
Living people
Cuban beach volleyball players
Olympic beach volleyball players of Cuba
Beach volleyball players at the 2016 Summer Olympics
Pan American Games medalists in volleyball
Beach volleyball players at the 2015 Pan American Games
Pan American Games bronze medalists for Cuba
Medalists at the 2015 Pan American Games